These historic properties and districts in the state of Texas are listed in the National Register of Historic Places.  Properties and/or districts are listed in most of Texas's 254 counties.

The tables linked below are intended to provide a complete list of properties and districts listed in each county.  The locations of National Register properties and districts with latitude and longitude data may be seen in an online map by clicking on "Map of all coordinates".

The names on the lists are as they were entered into the National Register; some place names are uncommon or have changed since being added to the National Register.



Current listings by county
The following are approximate tallies of current listings by county.

See also

List of bridges on the National Register of Historic Places in Texas
List of National Historic Landmarks in Texas
Recorded Texas Historic Landmark

Notes

References

 
Texas